Apiopetalum velutinum is a species of plant in the family Apiaceae. It is endemic to New Caledonia.

References

Mackinlayoideae
Endemic flora of New Caledonia
Conservation dependent plants
Taxa named by Henri Ernest Baillon
Taxonomy articles created by Polbot